Onsen UI is an open-source UI framework and components for HTML5 hybrid mobile app development, based on PhoneGap / Cordova. It allows developers to create mobile apps using Web technologies like CSS, HTML5, and JavaScript. While it was originally based on AngularJS and supported jQuery, with its version 2, Onsen UI has become JavaScript framework-agnostic, meaning developers can create mobile apps with or without any JavaScript framework. Onsen UI also provides comprehensive tools and services through Monaca, both products are developed by the same company. Onsen UI was created in 2013.

References 

Software frameworks